Allan Barry (born December 24, 1930) is a former American football offensive guard in the National Football League for the Green Bay Packers and the New York Giants. He also played in the American Football League for the Los Angeles Chargers. He played college football at the University of Southern California.

Early years
Barry attended Beverly Hills High School, before accepting a scholarship from the University of Southern California.

He was a two-way player, on offense, he was a tackle until his senior season when he was moved to guard. He contributed to the team winning the 1953 Rose Bowl. He also practiced the shot put.

Professional career

Green Bay Packers
Barry was selected by the Green Bay Packers in the 30th round (355th overall) of the 1953 NFL Draft with a future draft pick, which allowed the team to draft him before his college eligibility was over. He began his rookie season one year later and was named the starter at left guard. 

He spent the next two years out of football while serving his military service with the U.S. Air Force. He returned in 1957 and regained his starting position.

On September 15, 1958, he was traded along with offensive guard Joe Skibinski to the New York Giants in exchange for a seventh round draft choice (#83-Gary Raid).

New York Giants
Barry was a two-year starter at left guard with the New York Giants, contributing to the team reaching the 1958 and the 1959 NFL Championship Game.

Dallas Cowboys
He was selected by the Dallas Cowboys in the 1960 NFL Expansion Draft. He didn't want to move to Dallas, so he was traded to the Los Angeles Rams in exchange for linebacker Hugh Pitts.

Los Angeles Rams
Although he started most of the preseason at left guard, the Los Angeles Rams decided to move forward with younger players and he was released on September 19, 1960.

Los Angeles Chargers
In 1960, he was signed as a free agent by the Los Angeles Chargers of the American Football League. He was a part of the franchise's inaugural year and was named the starting offensive guard, while helping the team reach the 1960 American Football League Championship Game. He retired at the end of the season.

References

1930 births
Living people
Sportspeople from Beverly Hills, California
Players of American football from California
American football offensive guards
USC Trojans football players
Green Bay Packers players
Los Angeles Chargers players
New York Giants players